Philip Leslie Woodworth  is a British oceanographer based at the National Oceanography Centre. His research interests include sea level variation, climatology, and the global development of sea level monitoring networks. Woodworth studied for a degree in Physics at Durham University (Hatfield College), graduating in 1970. He went on to complete a doctorate at the University of Birmingham in 1974.

Career
Woodworth's initial training was in particle physics and early in his career he spent some time based at CERN. He has been associated with the National Oceanography Centre (formerly the Proudman Oceanographic Laboratory) since 1983.

From 1987 to 2007 Woodworth was the Director of the Permanent Service for Mean Sea Level - the global data bank for recording sea-level change. His role involved working with the Environment Agency to provide tidal analysis for UK coastal waters. He has worked closely with the IPCC, and was the lead author on the sea-level chapter for the second and third assessment reports. In 2005 he challenged the view of Nils-Axel Mörner and argued that rising sea levels do threaten the future existence of The Maldives. In 2010 he completed research in the Falkland Islands that concluded the sea-level of the islands had risen significantly since the mid-19th century and accelerated in recent decades.

Woodworth was awarded the Vening Meinesz Medal of the European Geosciences Union in 2010 and received an MBE in the 2011 New Year Honours.

Bibliography
Understanding Sea-Level Rise and Variability (Wiley-Blackwell, 2011)
Sea-Level Science: Understanding Tides, Surges, Tsunamis and Mean Sea-Level Changes (Cambridge University Press, 2014)

References

Living people
Alumni of the University of Birmingham
Alumni of Hatfield College, Durham
British oceanographers
Members of the Order of the British Empire
Year of birth missing (living people)